Duffey may refer to:
Duffey, California
Duffey Peak, a mountain in Canada
Duffey Strode, former street preacher
Duffey (surname)
Duffy (disambiguation)